Astorre II Manfredi (8 December 1412 – 12 March 1468) was lord of Imola from 1439 and of Faenza from 1443.

He was born in Faenza, the son of Gian Galeazzo I Manfredi. Apart Faenza and Imola, he was Papal vicar at Fusignano and other lands in Romagna together with his brother Gian Galeazzo II. He also fought as captain for several local rulers.

In 1431 he married Giovanna da Barbiano, daughter of the famous condottiero Alberico da Barbiano. His sons Carlo and Galeotto were both lords of Faenza after Astorre's death.

References
Page at www.condottieridiventura.it

Manfredi, Astorre 2
Manfredi, Astorre 2
Manfredi, Astorre 2
Astorre 2
Manfredi, Astorre 2
Lords of Imola
Lords of Faenza